Bob Bryan and Mike Bryan were the defending champions, but chose not to participate that year.

Mahesh Bhupathi and Mark Knowles won in the final 6–3, 6–3, against Christopher Kas and Philipp Kohlschreiber.

Seeds

Draw

Draw

External links
 Draw

Doubles